Canu Llywarch Hen (modern Welsh /'kani 'ɬəwarχ heːn/, the songs of Llywarch Hen) are a collection of early Welsh englyn-poems. They comprise the most famous of the early Welsh cycles of englynion about heroes of post-Roman North Britain.

Contents and themes

As edited by Jenny Rowland, the contents of Canu Llywarch Hen are as follows:

The poems contemplate martial, masculine culture, fate, and old age from a critical standpoint. As with the other so-called 'saga englynion’ (pre-eminently Canu Urien and Canu Heledd), there is considerable uncertainty and debate as to how the poems of Canu Llywarch might originally have been performed. It is usually assumed that they must have been accompanied by some kind of prose narrative, to which they provided emotional depth; but this is not certain.

In all the independent witnesses bar NLW 4973a, the Llywarch Hen poems are preceded by the englyn-poem Claf Abercuawg, which in the White Book is entitled 'Englynion Mabclaf ap Llywarch' (‘englynion of Mabclaf son of Llywarch’). However, modern scholars do not see it as originally linked to the Llywarch Hen material.

Manuscripts and dating

The poems are attested principally in the late fourteenth-century Red Book of Hergest. They were also included in the White Book of Rhydderch, but are now lost due to damage to the manuscript. However, they are attested in two later manuscripts descended from the White Book, Peniarth 111 (made by John Jones of Gellillyfdy in 1607), whose spelling is very close to the White Book's, and London, British Library, Add. MS 31055 (made by Thomas Wiliems in 1596), which is a less conservative copy. Some other late copies of lost medieval manuscripts of the englynion also exist: National Library of Wales 4973 contains two copies of the cycle, both copied by Dr John Davies of Mallwyd, one of Wales's leading antiquarians and scribes of his day, before 1631. The first copy, NLW 4973a, derives from a lost manuscript closer to the White Book than the Red. The second copy, NLW 4973b, is more complex and may represent a conflation of multiple medieval sources, but seems to have at least some independent value as a witness to the lost archetype of the poems. It is fairly clear that all these manuscripts descend from a lost common original, to which they are all fairly similar, making the creation of a critical edition of the poems relatively straightforward.

Despite surviving first in fourteenth-century manuscripts and in largely Middle Welsh orthography, the poems are thought mostly to have been composed in Old Welsh and transmitted orally and/or in manuscript, due to their archaic style and occasionally archaic spelling. Jenny Rowland judges that the two poems to Llywarch's son Gwên ('Gwên' and 'Marwnad Gwên') belong among the earliest stratum of saga-englynion, of the late eighth to the mid-ninth century, whereas some of the poems to his other sons are 'very late' (perhaps the twelfth century).

Historicity

Llywarch Hen himself may have been a historical figure—he appears in early Welsh royal genealogies, which situate him in sixth-century north Britain as a cousin of Urien Rheged (the subject of the stylistically similar Canu Urien). However, Canu Llywarch Hen associate Llywarch with Powys in Wales, and it is generally accepted that his story was relocated there by later tradition. It is not unlikely that the poetry of Canu Llywarch Hen was gradually built up from nothing more than these sparse genealogical references, with Llywarch's characterisation as an old man inspired by his epithet.

Example: 'Gwên and Llywarch'

An example of the Canu Llyrwarch Hen is the poem entitled 'Gwên and Llywarch' by Rowland:

Editions and translations

 Ifor Williams (ed.), Canu Llywarch Hen gyda Rhagmadrodd a Nodiadau (Cardiff: Gwasg Prifysgol Cymru, 1935) [2nd edn 1953].
 Jenny Rowland, Early Welsh Saga Poetry: A Study and Edition of the 'Englynion’ (Cambridge: Brewer, 1990) (includes editions pp. 404–18 and translations pp. 468–76)
 Patrick Ford (trans.), 'The Poetry of Llywarch Hen', in The Celtic Heroic Age: Literary Sources for Ancient Celtic Europe and Early Ireland and Wales, ed. by John T Koch and John Carey, Celtic Studies Publications, 1 (Aberystwyth: Celtic Studies Publications, 2003), pp. 385–404 (translations)
 Jenny Rowland, (ed.) A Selection of Early Welsh Saga Poems (London: Modern Humanities Research Association, 2014) (selected texts)

References

Welsh-language poems
Hen Ogledd